The 1917 French Army mutinies took place amongst French Army troops on the Western Front in Northern France during World War I. They started just after the unsuccessful and costly Second Battle of the Aisne, the main action in the Nivelle Offensive in April 1917. The new French commander of the armies in France, General Robert Nivelle, had promised a decisive victory over the Germans in 48 hours; morale in French armies rose to a great height and the shock of failure soured their mood overnight.

The mutinies and associated disruptions involved, to various degrees, nearly half of the French infantry divisions stationed on the Western Front. The term "mutiny" does not precisely describe events; soldiers remained in trenches and were willing to defend but refused orders to attack. Nivelle was sacked and replaced by General Philippe Pétain, who restored morale by talking to the men, promising no more suicidal attacks, providing rest and leave for exhausted units and moderating discipline. He held 3,400 courts martial in which 554 mutineers were sentenced to death and 26 were executed.

The catalyst for the mutinies was the extreme optimism and dashed hopes of the Nivelle Offensive, pacifism (stimulated by the Russian Revolution and the trade union movement) and disappointment at the non-arrival of American troops. French soldiers on the front had unrealistically been expecting US troops to arrive within days of the U.S. declaration of war. The mutinies were kept secret from the Germans and their full extent was not revealed until decades later. The German failure to detect the mutinies has been described as one of the most serious intelligence failures of the war.

Background

More than one million French soldiers (    early 1917), out of a population of twenty million males of all ages, had been killed in fighting by early 1917. The losses had weakened the French will to attack. In April 1917, General Robert Nivelle promised a war-winning decisive victory. He proposed to work closely with the British Army to break through the German lines on the Western Front by a great attack against the German-occupied Chemin des Dames, a long and prominent ridge that runs east to west, just north of the Aisne River. Nivelle applied a tactic that he had used with success at the  First and Second Offensive Battles of Verdun in October and December 1916, a creeping barrage in which French artillery fired its shells to land just in front of the advancing infantry to keep the Germans under cover until they had been overrun.

Nivelle's attack (the Second Battle of the Aisne) failed to achieve its main war-winning objective. At the cost of very high casualties, the offensive exhausted the German reserves and conquered some tactically important positions. A French tank attack had also been launched near Berry-au-Bac but half of the Schneider CA1 tanks engaged were knocked out. Nivelle was removed from his command on 15 May 1917 and was replaced by General Philippe Pétain. A similar battle would have been considered a draw in 1915 but in 1917, after the huge losses at the Battle of Verdun and the Battle of the Somme, the psychology of the soldiers was fragile. The strategic failure and the casualties caused a collapse in the morale of the French infantrymen, who had been so enthusiastic just a few days before. The U.S. entry into the war in early April 1917 was met with euphoria in France.

Mutinies
The Nivelle Offensive failed to achieve its strategic objectives and by 25 April, most of the fighting had ended. On 3 May, the French 2nd Division refused to follow orders to attack and the mutiny soon spread throughout the army. For most of the time events were independent and were focused on specific demands, more liberty, more time with families and better conditions in cantonments. From  there were disturbances in a Chasseur battalion of the 127th Division and a regiment of the 18th Division. Two days later, a battalion of the 166th Division staged a demonstration and on 20 May, the 128th Regiment of the 3rd Division and the 66th Regiment of the 18th Division refused orders. Individual incidents of insubordination occurred in the 17th Division. Over the next two days, spokesmen were elected in two regiments of the 69th Division to petition for an end to the offensive. By 28 May, mutinies broke out in the 9th Division, 158th Division, 5th Division and the 1st Cavalry Division. A record  soldiers deserted in 1917; the offensive was suspended on 9 May.

Even in regiments in which there was direct confrontation, such as the 74th Infantry Regiment, the men did not harm their officers but refused to attack. Most mutineers were veterans who did not refuse to fight but wanted the military authorities to be more attentive to the realities of modern war. The soldiers had come to believe that the attacks they were ordered to make were futile. News on the February Revolution in Russia was being published in French socialist newspapers and anonymous pacifist propaganda leaflets were very widely distributed. In Soissons, Villers-Cotterêts, Fère-en-Tardenois and Cœuvres-et-Valsery, troops refused orders or to go to the front. On 1 June, a French infantry regiment took over the town of Missy-aux-Bois. Ashworth wrote that the mutinies were "widespread and persistent" and involved more than half the divisions in the French army. On 7 June, Pétain told British commander Sir Douglas Haig that two French divisions had refused to relieve two divisions in the front line.

In 1967, Guy Pedroncini examined French military archives and discovered that 49 infantry divisions were destabilised and experienced episodes of mutiny. Of the 49, nine divisions were gravely affected by mutinous behavior, 15 were seriously affected and 25 divisions were affected by isolated but repeated instances of mutinous behavior. Altogether, 43 per cent of the 113 infantry divisions of the Army had been affected by the end of 1917. The crisis of morale occurred mainly in the infantry, which had borne the brunt of casualties. Branches such as the heavy artillery, which was located far behind the front lines and those cavalry regiments that were still mounted, remained unaffected by the mutinies and provided detachments to round up deserters and restore order. Only 12 field artillery regiments were affected by the crisis of indiscipline.

Repression
From 8 June, the military authorities took swift and decisive action: mass arrests were followed by mass trials. Those arrested were selected by their own officers and NCOs, with the implicit consent of the rank and file. In 1967, research by Guy Pedroncini found  of hard labour and  sentences but only  these were carried out. The relative lack of rigour in repressing the mutinies provoked adverse reactions among some French divisional commanders. Pétain and French President Raymond Poincaré, on the other hand, made it their policy to mend the French Army's morale and to avoid acting in a way that could aggravate the loss.

When the news of the revolution in Russia and the abdication of the Tsar reached France there were some demonstrations amongst Russian units in France. When an order from Russia to elect soviets was received on 16 April, the French Army whisked the Russians away from the front and moved them to central France. The Russians put on a big May Day parade and then mutinied. The First Russian Brigade was encircled by loyal Russian troops in September 1917 at Camp de La Courtine and bombarded with artillery, killing eight men and wounding 28. That episode became the basis of widespread false rumours that the French had bombarded French units. The Russian troops (about ) were demobilised, transferred to labor battalions and the ringleaders were sent to North Africa in penal servitude.

Along with the deterrent of military justice, Pétain offered more regular and longer leave and an end to grand offensives "until the arrival of tanks and Americans on the front". They feared that infantry offensives could never prevail over the fire of machine-guns and artillery. Pétain restored morale by a combination of rest periods, frequent rotations of the front-line units and regular home furloughs.

Aftermath

Analysis
The most persistent episodes of collective indiscipline involved a relatively small number of French divisions; the mutinies did not threaten a complete military collapse. Because of the low morale in more than half of the French Army, it took until the early months of 1918 for the French Army fully to recover. Because of the mutinies, the French high command became reluctant to begin another offensive. Pétain's strategy in late 1917 was to wait for the deployment of the American Expeditionary Forces and the introduction of the new and highly effective Renault FT tanks,  ("I am waiting for the tanks and the Americans"). He had the support of Georges Clemenceau, who told President Woodrow Wilson in June 1917 that France planned "to wait for the Americans & meanwhile not lose more.... I like Pétain... just because he won't attack". Martin Evans wrote "the French army would sit tight and wait for the Americans". Christopher Andrew and Kanya-Forster wrote in 1981 "Even after Petain's skilful mixture of tact and firmness had restored military discipline, the French army could only remain on the defensive and wait for the Americans".

When the Americans arrived in France in the spring of 1917, they were inexperienced and US generals had orders not to accept responsibility for military zones. The US generals were ordered to "understudy" the British. This meant that for the summer and autumn of 1917, British troops had to take over the zones that the French had vacated and also teach American troops. The British tried to reinvigorate French morale by launching the Third Battle of Ypres, with varied success but pertinently relieving pressure on the French to the south. It was not until early 1918, when the US troops had completed their preparations for war, that French morale improved. The Allies withstood the German spring offensive and in the Hundred Days Offensive comprehensively defeated the German Armies, which with the British naval blockade of Germany paid dividends. Starved of food, Germany collapsed on the home front. Its leadership was compelled to sue for peace, as the army and the front were quickly pushed back.

History
The French government suppressed news of the mutinies to avoid alerting the Germans or harming morale on the home front. The extent and the intensity of the mutinies were disclosed for the first time in 1967 by Guy Pedroncini, in Les Mutineries de 1917. His project had been made possible by the opening of most of the military archives, fifty years after the events, a delay that was in conformity with French War Ministry procedure. There were still undisclosed archives on the mutinies in the 21st century, which were believed to contain documents mostly of a political nature; they were not to be opened to researchers until 100 years after the mutinies, in 2017.

Leonard Smith has argued that the mutinies were akin to labour strikes and could be considered, at least partly, political in nature. The soldiers demanded more leave, better food and objected to the use of colonial workers on the home front. They were also deeply concerned about the welfare of their families. The rather subdued repression, according to Smith, was part of the Pétain policy of appeasement. Smith placed the mutinies into their wider ideological context and demonstrated the extent to which French soldiers and mutineers accepted the main tenets of Republican ideology.

See also

 Étaples Mutiny (September 1917)
 Paths of Glory (1957 film)

Footnotes

Bibliography

Further reading
 
 
 
 
 
 

Conflicts in 1917
France in World War I
Military discipline and World War I
Mutinies in World War I
1917 in France
Opposition to World War I
Subsidiary conflicts of World War I
Revolutions of 1917–1923